The 1970–71 season was the 69th in the history of the Western Football League.

The champions for the second time in their history were Bideford.

Final table
The league was reduced from twenty clubs to eighteen after Portland United, Weymouth Reserves and Yeovil Town Reserves left, and one new club joined:

Plymouth City

References

1970-71
5